This common name may refer to the following species:

 Acanthogryllus fortipes
 Gryllus assimilis

Animal common name disambiguation pages